The 2013–14 season is Biu Chun Rangers's 35th, as well as 2nd consecutive, season in the Hong Kong First Division League. Biu Chun Rangers will compete in the First Division League, Senior Challenge Shield and FA Cup.

Key events
 18 May 2013: The club confirmed that Hong Kong forward Lam Hok Hei joins Indonesian Super League club Persija Jakarta on a 4-month loan transfer until 31 August 2013.
 26 May 2013: Brazilian striker Giovane Alves da Silva joins newly promoted side Eastern Salon on a free transfer.
 29 May 2013: Hong Kong midfielder Chow Cheuk Fung joins the club from Tuen Mun on a free transfer.
 30 May 2013: Hong Kong midfielder Cheng King Ho leaves the club and joins newly promoted side Yuen Long on a free transfer.
 30 May 2013: Club director Philip Lee confirms the departure of Wong Chin Hung, Chan Siu Yuen and Lau Nim Yat.
 2 June 2013: Hong Kong midfielder Lau Nim Yat leaves the club and joins newly promoted side Eastern Salon on a free transfer.
 2 June 2013: Hong Kong defender Chan Siu Yuen leaves the club and joins fellow First Division side Citizen on a free transfer.
 8 June 2013: Hong Kong defender Chan Cham Hei joins the club from First Division club South China on a free transfer after his contract with South China expiries and is released by them.
 8 June 2013: Hong Kong defender Lai Ka Fai makes a return to First Division football as he joins the club from Fourth Division club Mutual on a free transfer.
 8 June 2013: Cameroon-born Hong Kong striker Julius Akosah leaves the club and join newly promoted First Division club Happy Valley for an undisclosed fee.
 8 June 2013: Cameroon-born Hong Kong midfielder Wilfred Bamnjo leaves the club and joins newly promoted First Division club Happy Valley for an undisclosed fee.
 11 June 2013: Hong Kong defender Wong Chin Hung leaves the club and joins newly promoted First Division club Eastern Salon on a free transfer.
 20 June 2013: Hong Kong goalkeeper Wong Tsz Him leaves the club and joins fellow First Division club Sunray Cave JC Sun Hei for an undisclosed fee.
 6 July 2013: The club appoints José Ricardo Rambo as the head coach of the club in the following season.
 14 July 2013: Ghana-born naturalised Hong Kong defender Moses Mensah joins the club from fellow First Division club Citizen on a free transfer.
 14 July 2013: Youth team players Marco Wegener, Cheung Siu Kwan, Man Wai Sum, Ho Chik Hin and Ng Clinton are promoted to the first team in the following season.
 20 July 2013: Brazilian midfielder Rian Marques joins the club from Finland third-tier division Kakkonen club Oulun Rotuaarin Pallo for an undisclosed fee.
 1 January 2014: Hong Kong midfielder Li Ka Chun leaves the club and joins fellow First Division club Biu Chun Rangers for an undisclosed fee.

Players

Squad information

Transfers

In

Out

Loan In

Loan out

Club

Coaching staff

Squad statistics

Overall Stats
{|class="wikitable" style="text-align: center;"
|-
!width="100"|
!width="60"|First Division
!width="60"|Senior Shield
!width="60"|FA Cup
!width="60"|Total Stats
|-
|align=left|Games played    ||  9  ||  2  || 0  || 11
|-
|align=left|Games won       ||  2  ||  1  || 0  || 3
|-
|align=left|Games drawn     ||  5  ||  0  || 0  || 5
|-
|align=left|Games lost      ||  2  ||  1  || 0  || 3
|-
|align=left|Goals for       ||  10 ||  3  || 0  || 13
|-
|align=left|Goals against   ||  11 ||  4  || 0  || 15
|- =
|align=left|Players used    ||  22 ||  15 || 0  || 221
|-
|align=left|Yellow cards    ||  24 ||  4  || 0  || 28
|-
|align=left|Red cards       ||  1  ||  0  || 0  || 1
|-

Players Used: Biu Chun Rangers has used a total of 22 different players in all competitions.

Squad Stats

Top scorers

Disciplinary record
Includes all competitive matches. Players listed below made at least one appearance for South China first squad during the season.

Substitution record
Includes all competitive matches.

Last updated: 15 December 2013

Captains

Competitions

Overall

First Division League

Classification

Results summary

Results by round

Matches

Pre-season friendlies

First Division League

Senior Shield

Notes

References

Hong Kong Rangers FC seasons
Hon